These are the results of 2019 BWF World Senior Championships' 70+ events.

Men's singles

Seeds 
  Johan Croukamp (gold medalist)
  Per Dabelsteen (silver medalist)
  Jim Garrett (bronze medalist)
  Carl-Johan Nybergh (quarterfinals)
  Hubert Miranda (bronze medalist)
  Anthony Lourdes (quarterfinals)
  Apirat Siwapornpitak (third round)
  Harry Skydsgaard (second round)

Finals

Top half

Section 1

Section 2

Bottom half

Section 3

Section 4

Women's singles

Seeds 
  Elvira Richter (bronze medalist)
  Sumiko Kaneko (bronze medalist)
  Yuriko Okemoto (gold medalist)
  Irene Sterlie (quarterfinals)

Finals

Top half

Section 1

Section 2

Bottom half

Section 3

Section 4

Men's doubles

Seeds 
  Knud Danielsen / Torben Hansen (silver medalists)
  Johan Croukamp /  Carl-Johan Nybergh (gold medalists)
  Michael John Cox / Jim Garrett (bronze medalists)
  Gavin Horrocks / Grahame L. Moscrop (quarterfinals)

Finals

Top half

Section 1

Section 2

Bottom half

Section 3

Section 4

Women's doubles

Seeds 
  Haruko Asakoshi / Yasuko Kataito (gold medalists)
  Renate Gabriel / Elvira Richter (quarterfinals)

Group A

Group B

Group C

Group D

Finals

Mixed doubles

Seeds 
  Per Dabelsteen / Irene Sterlie (quarterfinals)
  Knud Danielsen / Margrette Danielsen (quarterfinals)'
  Jim Garrett / Angela Brown (second round)  Roger Baldwin / Vicki Betts (second round)''

Finals

Top half

Section 1

Section 2

Bottom half

Section 3

Section 4

References 
Men's singles
Women's singles
Men's doubles
Women's doubles
Mixed doubles

2019 BWF World Senior Championships